McLaurin is a small unincorporated community in Forrest County, Mississippi, United States.

History 
The town of McLaurin is named for General McLaurin, who was also the first president of the Gulf and Ship Island Railroad.  At one time, McLaurin was the site of the largest sawmill in the country, becoming an important shipping site for masonite and pulp wood.  The manager of the first sawmill in the area, Jim Barron, is buried in McLaurin Cemetery.

The population in 1900 was 300.

A post office operated under the name McLaurin from 1896 to 1974.

A historic landing field for aircraft is located south of the settlement.

The McLaurin Salt Dome is a salt dome named after the community.

Education 
 Forrest County Agricultural High School
 South Forrest Elementary School

Infrastructure

Transportation 
McLaurin is served by U.S. Route 49, a north–south corridor that runs through Arkansas and Mississippi.

Places of worship 
 McLaurin United Methodist Church
 Morning Star Church
 Old Enon Church
 First Baptist Church of McLaurin

References

Unincorporated communities in Mississippi
Unincorporated communities in Forrest County, Mississippi
Hattiesburg metropolitan area